Salihler is a village in Dikili district of  İzmir Province, Turkey. It is at the north of Dikili. The population of the village  is 1948 as of 2011.

References

İzmir Province
Villages in Dikili District